The Battle of Stavuchany was a battle between the Russian and Ottoman armies, which took place on August 17(28) of 1739 during the Russo-Turkish War of 1735-1739.

Prelude
Stavuchany (Moldovan Stăuceni) is a small moldavian village some 12 km southwest of Khotyn (today's Chernivtsi Oblast in Ukraine). The Russian army (approx. 61,000 men and 250 cannons) under the command of Field Marshal Burkhard Christoph von Münnich approached Stavuchany, where the Ottoman army (80,000 to 90,000 men) under the leadership of serasker Veli Pasha was concentrated. The army consisted of 30-40,000 Turks (including the garrison of the Khotyn fortress) and Crimean Tatars (up to 50,000, according to Russian estimates), with 70 guns. The Turks blocked the way to Khotyn, while the Tatars surrounded the Russian army from the rear and threatened its wagon train. By the evening of August 16 (27), Münnich's army was surrounded in the lowlands, but repulsed all the attacks of the Turkish and Tatar cavalry. The main forces of the Turks with artillery occupied the commanding heights beyond the Shulanets River, on the road to Khotyn, and fortified there.

Battle
On the morning of August 17 (28), Munnich moved a strong detachment under the command of Gustav Biron (brother of Ernst Johann von Biron, a lover of Empress Anna of Russia) across the river. This detachment stood for several hours under Turkish artillery fire, and then retreated back across the river. The Turks decided that the offensive of the Russian army was repulsed, and Veli Pasha even sent a corresponding report to Khotyn. However, at this time, the Russians built a large number of bridges across the Shulanets River on their right flank (where Karl Biron, another brother of Empress's lover, commanded) and with their entire army rushed there, bypassing the fortified positions of the Turks from the east. The Turks launched several attacks trying to stop this advance, but were completely defeated and fled, leaving their fortified camp, which was captured by the Russian army. The Russian army captured some 50 cannons and other trophies.

Aftermath
According to Russian data, the Ottoman army left more than 1,000 people killed on the battlefield (the number of wounded is unknown). In the official report of Münnich, the losses of the Russian army were indicated in only 13 killed and 54 wounded. However, these data are completely unreliable. So, for the Semenovsky regiment, losses are indicated as 1 wounded person. Actually in the fighting on August 16-17, the regiment lost 43 men killed and 102 wounded. Other estimates of Russian casualties indicate a total of 1,800-2,000 killed and wounded.

As a result of the Battle of Stavuchany, the Ottoman fortress of Khotyn was captured on August 19(30) and the Russians occupied most of the Moldavia in September. Despite the victory, Russia had to agree to the terms of the Treaty of Belgrade (September 18(29), 1739) due to Austria's withdrawal from the war, which practically reduced the achievements of the Russian army to zero.

References

Template:Portal (view source) (protected)

Stavuchany
Stavuchany
Stavuchany
1739 in Europe
Stavuchany
1730s in Ukraine
Stavuchany
1739 in the Russian Empire
Russo-Turkish War (1735–1739)